Alan William Sealey (born Hampton, London, UK, 24 February 1942 – died February 1996) was an English footballer. Sealey, an outside right, initially played for Leyton Orient in 1960, before moving to West Ham United, in a player exchange for Dave Dunmore, where he played from 1961 to 1967.

Sealey celebrated getting married in May 1965 just one week before he would go on to score both goals in West Ham's 2–0 win against TSV 1860 Munich in the 1965 European Cup Winners' Cup final at Wembley Stadium. He had previously scored just three goals for the east London club that season.

Sealey's top flight career virtually ended within a year of this. He was playing cricket with teammates during a rest in pre-season training, and broke his leg while falling over a wooden bench. He ended his league career playing for Plymouth Argyle in 1967, but continued playing with non-league sides Bedford Town, Romford and Ashford Town. 

His family maintained its close connection to West Ham United, with his nephew, Les, and grand-nephews signing for the team between 1994 and 2001. Sealey died suddenly at his home in Collier Row, Romford in February 1996 from a heart attack, aged 53, just over five years before the same condition would claim the life of his nephew, Les at age 43. The older Sealey was survived by his wife Barbara and his son Anthony.

Honours
West Ham United
FA Cup: 1963–64
European Cup Winners' Cup: 1964–65

References

External links
Plymouth Argyle career details
 The European Cup Winners Cup at The National Football Museum

1942 births
1996 deaths
English footballers
Association football wingers
Leyton Orient F.C. players
Plymouth Argyle F.C. players
West Ham United F.C. players
People from Hampton, London
Footballers from the London Borough of Richmond upon Thames
English Football League players
Bedford Town F.C. players
Romford F.C. players
Ashford United F.C. players